Charles Dubost may refer to:
 Charles Dubost (lawyer)
 Charles Dubost (surgeon)